The 2012–13 USC Upstate Spartans men's basketball team represented the University of South Carolina Upstate during the 2012–13 NCAA Division I men's basketball season. The Spartans, led by 11th year head coach Eddie Payne, played their home games at the G. B. Hodge Center and were members of the Atlantic Sun Conference. They finished the season 16–17, 9–9 in A-Sun play to finish in a three-way tie for fourth place. They advanced to the semifinals of the Atlantic Sun tournament where they lost to Mercer.

Roster

Schedule

|-
!colspan=9| Regular season

|-
!colspan=9| 2013 Atlantic Sun men's basketball tournament

References

USC Upstate Spartans men's basketball seasons
South Carolina Upstate
Charleston Southern Buc South Carolina
Charleston Southern Buc South Carolina